Baller Blockin is a 2000 drama film set in New Orleans' Magnolia Projects. It stars Bryan “Birdman” Williams, Ronald "Slim" Williams, Juvenile, Manuel Vazquez, B.G., Lil Wayne, Turk, and Mannie Fresh with cameos by comedians Anthony Johnson and T.K. Kirkland.

The film's soundtrack is performed by the Cash Money Millionaires.

See also 
 List of hood films

References

External links
 

2000 films
2000 drama films
Films about drugs
Films set in 2000
Films set in New Orleans
American drama films
Hood films
2000s English-language films
2000s American films